Kosić is a village in the municipality of Danilovgrad, Montenegro. It is located along the road from Podgorica to Danilovgrad.

Demographics
According to the 2011 census, its population was 515.

References

Populated places in Danilovgrad Municipality